Rina Mor-Goder (née Messinger; February 16, 1956) is an Israeli lawyer, writer and beauty queen who was crowned Miss Universe 1976.

Biography
Rina Goder (née Messinger) was born in Kiryat Tiv'on, near Haifa. Her father was a mechanic and pilot in the Israeli Air Force and her mother was a kindergarten teacher. Rina Mor-Goder became a lawyer and mother of two daughters.

Beauty queen
She was the first Miss Israel ever to win the Miss Universe crown.

In 1989 and 2004, she was a judge in the Miss Israel competition.

In 1981, she wrote a book on her experience as Miss Universe.

After her reign as Miss Universe, Messinger worked in public relations for the Jewish Agency and Israel Bonds in New York. After four years she returned to Israel and continued working in public relations for a private company. There she met her husband, with whom she has two daughters.

On December 12, 2021, Rina was part of Miss Universe 2021 Selection Committee Members during the Preliminary Competition.

Legal career
In 1991, she began studying law at Tel Aviv University. After completing her bachelor's degree with honours, the family left for the Netherlands. She completed her master's degree there, specializing in family law. In 2002, after six years in the Netherlands, the family returned to Israel. Mor-Godor is a lawyer in Tel Aviv, working on her doctorate and appearing every week on the morning show of Channel 10, where she gives advice on family law.

See also
Women in Israel

References

1956 births
Israeli beauty pageant winners
Israeli female models
Israeli lawyers
Israeli people of Romanian-Jewish descent
Israeli women lawyers
Jewish female models
Living people
Miss Israel winners
Miss Universe 1976 contestants
Miss Universe winners
People from Kiryat Tiv'on
Tel Aviv University alumni